Xenungulata ("strange ungulates") is an order of extinct and primitive South American hoofed mammals that lived from the Late Paleocene to Early Eocene (Itaboraian to Casamayoran in the SALMA classification). Fossils of the order are known from deposits in Brazil, Argentina, Peru, and Colombia. The best known member of this enigmatic order is the genus Carodnia, a tapir-like and -sized animal with a gait similar to living African elephants.

Description 
Xenungulates are characterized by bilophodont M1–2 and M1–2, similar to pyrotheres, and complex lophate third molars, similar to uintatheres. Though other relationships, to arctocyonids for example, have been suggested, no proofs thereof have been found. The foot bones of xenungulates were short and robust and their digits terminated in broad, flat, and unfissured hoof-like unguals, quite unlike any other meridiungulates. The discovery of Etayoa in Colombia made it clear that xenungulates are distinct from other groups: Etayoa lacks lophate molar talonid (in contrast to Carodnia) and, since no distinct lophodonty is present in basal pyrotheres, there is reason to assume that bilophodonty evolved separately in xenungulates and pyrotheres. Xenungulates also show some dental similarity to primitive astrapotheres.

Taxonomy 
 grouped Carodnia with pyrotheres based on a similarity in astragalus morphology, but later concluded that this observation was incorrect.

Notoetayoa is most closely related to Etayoa.

Distribution 

Xenungulata fossils have been found in:
 Bogotá Formation, Casamayoran, Colombia
 Peñas Coloradas Formation, Riochican, Argentina
 Mogollón Formation, Itaboraian-Riochican, Peru
 Itaboraí Formation, Itaboraian, Brazil

References

Bibliography 

 
 
 
 
 
 
 
 
 

Meridiungulata
Paleocene mammals of South America
Eocene mammals of South America
Paleocene first appearances
Eocene extinctions
Casamayoran
Itaboraian
Riochican
Fossil taxa described in 1952